The 2nd CISM World Winter Games were held in Annecy, France from 24–30 March 2013.

Participating nations 
Overall, athletes from 40 countries participated.

Medal table

Medal winners

Alpine skiing

Men

Women

Biathlon

Men

Women

Cross-country skiing

Men

Women

Short track

Men

Women

Ski mountaineering

Men

Women

Ski orienteering

Men

Women

Sport climbing

Men

Women

References

External links

  Official website

Military World Games
2013 in winter sports
2013 in French sport
Military